Kawee Tanjararak ( or Beam) is a Thai singer and actor, who was a member of the Thai boy band D2B which also included Worrawech Danuwong and Panrawat Kittikorncharoen. After his contract with RS was invalidated, he became a freelance actor and singer.

Biography

Early life

Kawee Tanjararak or Beam was born on 18 May 1980 in Thailand. He was named Rawee, but changed his name before he entered high school. He is the eldest brother of three siblings. The youngest sister Bua-Sarocha is an actress and singer as well.

Breakthrough

Beam debuted as model and actor when he was studying in year two of university. Then, he made contract with RS Public Company Limited 1999. Soon after, he was well known as a member of the Thai boy band  D2B, which also included Dan-Worrawech and Big-Panrawat in 2001. D2B won the Most Popular Artists award from the MTV Music Awards of 2003 in Singapore, but, unfortunately, their second official album was just being revealed when sorrowful happening occurred.

On July 22, 2003, Big got in car accident and was in a coma. Because of this, Beam made the decision to ordain on September 21, 2003. After he left the monkhood, Beam and Dan performed the charity album "D2B the Neverending Album Tribute to Big D2B" and concert "D2B the Neverending Concert Tribute to Big D2B" to give Big's family the profit for treatment outgoing. Then, Beam traveled to Australia to study English program from Queensland College Of English for about six months.

In 2005, Beam and Dan come back as duo band Dan-Beam. Their album had received positive feedback just like D2B did, but, finally, they announced the termination of D2B on October 25, 2007. Their last special album "DB2B (Dan-Beam to Big)" was also the charity album for Big's family.

In 2008, Beam's solo album was released. Furthermore, he was assigned as the first WWF Ambassador of Thailand for three years continuously to participate in many environmental events, such as Earth Hour.

A year before termination of RS's contract in 2010, Beam was suspended by RS. So, he began to spend two years looking after his own business Trip Buster Ltd, which was closed down in 2013. He came back on screen in winter 2011 and released a solo single in summer 2012. Now, he is a freelance actor and singer.

Present and upcoming projects

 Role as Seong of Ra-Berd-Therd-Therng Sing-To-Thong the sitcom ... Airing
 Lun-Rak-Kham-Rua the series ... Airing
 Game-Ma-Ya ... Shooting
 Ban-Lang-Dok-Mai ... Shooting
* Ordered by official announcement date

Education

 Primary School: Assumption Samrong School
 High School: Rachwinit Bangkeaw School
 Diploma: Pre-Engineering Program, College of Industrial Technology from King Mongkut's University of Technology North Bangkok
 Under Graduate: B.Eng., Department of Mechanical Engineering, Faculty of Engineering from Chulalongkorn University
 Graduated: MBA English Program, Faculty of Commerce and Accountancy from Chulalongkorn University

Career

Discography

Studio Album

D2B

 D2B (2001)
 D2B Summer (2002)
 Type Two (2003)
 D2B the Neverending Album Tribute to Big D2B (2004) ...Chan-Ja-Jab-Mheu-Ther-Aw-Wai song was produced by Beam (lyric) and Dan (melody).

Dan-Beam

 The Album (2005)
 The Album II: Relax (2006)
 The Album 3: Freedom (2007)
 DB2B (Dan-Beam to Big) (2007)

Beam

 Beam (2008) ...Duai-Hua-Jai-Ther song was written by Beam

Special songs

D2B
 Meu-Thee-Mong-Mai-Hen - RS Meeting Concert 2001 Star Mission's special song (2001)
 Tuk-Wi-Na-Thee (Acoustic Version) - RS Acoustic for Friends' special song (2002)
 Mee-Ther - RS Star Club's special song (2002)
 Marathon - Marathon Dance Expo (2003)
 Sud-Rang-Ten - Marathon Dance Expo (2003)
 Chai-Mak-A-Rom-Nee - Marathon Dance Expo (2003)
 D2B YMCA MIX - Marathon Dance Expo (2003)
 Yu-Thee-Ther-Leau - Anti-Counterfeit Concert (2003)
 Tham-Duai-Mhue Sang-Duai-Jai Anti-Counterfeit Concert (2003)

Dan-Beam
 Thing-Hua-Jai-Wai-Thee-Ther - MIXICLUB's special song (2005)
 Ya-Krod-Nan - MIXICLUB's special song (2005)
 Luk-Kong-Poe - Luk-Kong-Poe album (2006)
 Pleaw-Fai-Haeng-Plai-Fan - Suphanburi's Game (2006)
 Kon-Thai-Rak-Kan - Southern Thailand Insurgency-involved song (2006)
 Infinite - Freedom Around the World Live in Concert's special song (2007) ...Lyric by Beam and melody by Dan
 Nai-Jai-Ter-Mee-Hua-Jai-Chan-Eak-Duang - "Ma-Has-Sa-Jan-Kwam-Kid-Teung" D2B Encore Concert 2015 ...Melody by Dan

Beam
 Duai-Ai-Rak - OST. Sexphone and the Lonely Wave (2003)
 Klab-Ma-Dai-Mhai - OST. Sexphone and the Lonely Wave (2003)
 Tha-Mae-Mai-Leau-Krai-Rak - Missing Mom Riang-Kuam-Ruan-Mae album (2005)
 Porn-Kong-Poe - Luk-Kong-Poe album (2006)
 Kon-Klai-Chid-Kid-Ja-Seung - OST. Ku-Pan-Ku-Puan (2008)
 Pak-Kang-Kwa-Jai - OST. Sed-Thee-Kang-Khiang (2009)
 Sak-Wan-Chan-Ja-Jab-Mheu-Ther - OST. Sed-Thee-Kang-Khiang (2009)
 Jud-Plian - Love Maker II by AM:PM (2009)
 Mai-Yak-Mai-Mee-Ther - OST. Bangkok Sweeter (2011)
 Rak-Rai-Siang - OST. Mae-Tang-Rom-Bai (2012)
 Rak-Mai-Roo-Dab - OST. Jood-Nut-Pob (2012)

Concerts

D2B

 RS Meeting Concert Star Mission (2001) ... Guest
 D2B Summer Live in Concert (2002)
 Marathon Dance Expo Concert (2002) ... Guest
 D2B Goodtime Thanks Concert for Friends (2002)
 Anti-Counterfeiting Concert (2002) ... Guest
 D2B the Miracle Concert (2003)
 PCT Marathon Dance (2003) ... Guest
 Anti-Counterfeiting Concert (2002) ... Guest
 D2B the Neverending Concert Tribute to Big D2B (2004)
 "Kid-Teung" (Missing) D2B Live Concert 2014 (2014)
 "Ma-Has-Sa-Jan-Kwam-Kid-Teung" D2B Encore Concert 2015 (2015)

Dan-Beam

 Kid-Mak Concert (2005)
 Unseen Concert (2005)
 Riang-Kuam-Rung-Mae (2005) ... Guest
 Thai-Chinese Friendship Concert (2005) ... Guest
 Nice Club Concert (2006)
 Rao-Ja-Pen-Kon-Dee Concert (2007) ... Guest
 Freedom Around the World Live in Concert (2007)
 Concert Pleng-Khong-Po Ja-Rong-Pleng-Po Hai-Preo-Tee-Sud (2014) ... Guest

Beam

 One Man & Fan-Krai-Mai-Ru Concert (2008)
 Salz Systema Show in One 22 (2009) ...Guest
 Halloo Beam Concert (2009)
 My Name is Kim Concert (2009) ...Guest
 My Blue World Concert (2009) ...Guest
 72 Years Chula Accounting Charity Concert and Enjoy with Soontraporn Song (2011) ...Guest

Music videos
 Ther-Rak-Chan-Roo - Momay (2001)
 Sa-Pa-Wa-Thing-Tua - Dan (2011)
 Bao-Wan - Wan Thanakrit (2012)

Filmography

 Where is Tong (2001) ... Khing
 Omen (2003) ... Beam
 Sexphone and the Lonely Wave (2003) ... Due
 Noodle Boxer (2006) ... - (Extra)
 Ponglang Amazing Theatre (2007) ... Win
 Bangkok Sweety (2011) ... Fin
 Valentine Sweety (2012) ... Fin
 Sat2Mon (2012) ... Pokpong
 The Room (2013) ... Bo

Television

Lakorns (Thai-style series)

 Pee-Nong-Song-Luad (2005) ... Phuwanart
 Hi Baby! (2005–2006) ... Cherngchai
 Mang-Korn-Soan-Pa-Yak (2006) ... Morakot
 Pud-Rak-Na-Mo (2007) ... Mothana
 Ku-Pan-Ku-Puan (2007–2008) ... Somkid
 Four Reigns (special episode) (2008) ... Aod
 Sed-Thee-Kang-Kiang (2010) ... Kim
 Mae-Tang-Rom-Bai (2012) ... Mike-Maitree
 Than-Chai-Nai-Sai-Mhok (2012) ... Fahkram(Extra)
 The Raven and the Swan (2013) ... Saharat
 Rak-Sud-Rit (2013) ... POL.SUB.LT. Tan Sattayarak
 Song-Rak-Song-Win-Yan (2015) ... Wach-Anawach
 Game-Ma-Ya (2016) ... Kawin Akkarawong (Wim)
 Ban-Lang-Dok-Mai (2016) ... Songrob Buriyaprawat (rob)
 Glarb Pai Soo Wun Fun (2019) ... Dr.Kanchat
 Game Rak Ao Keun (2019) ... Dr.Akkapoom
 Ran Dok Ngiew (2022) ... Dr.Adthanob Parama (Nob)

Series and sitcoms
 Rod-Duan-Ka-Buan-Sud-Thai (2005–2006) ... Jue
 Puan-Sab-See-Kun-See (2006) ... V(Guest)
 Love Therapy (2011) ... Doc. Phum-Phumrat
 Jood-Nut-Pob (2012–2015) ... Pop-POL.CAPT. Eakkapop Benjanakin
 Sud-Yod (2012) ... Doc. Good(Guest)
 Ra-Berd-Tiang-Thaew-Trong (2014) ... Dr.Kim
 Ra-Berd-Therd-Therng Sing-To-Thong (2015–present) ... Seong
 Lun-Rak-Kham-Rua (2015–Present) ... Tee-Yai
 Turn Left Turn Right (2020) ... Pat

Show
 Dan-Beam the Series (2007) ...Moderator
 Thailand's Most Famous (2012) ... Commentator
 Tua-Jing the Premier (2013–2014) ... Competitor

MC
 Television 
 2007 : "แดนบีม เดอะซีรีส์" On Air Channel 9

 Online 
 2019 : - On Air YouTube:Beam-Oil Channel

External links

References

Kawee Tanjararak
Kawee Tanjararak
Living people
1980 births
Kawee Tanjararak
Kawee Tanjararak
Thai television personalities
Kawee Tanjararak